The 1954 Lamar Tech Cardinals football team was an American football team that represented Lamar State College of Technology (now known as Lamar University) during the 1954 college football season as a member of the Lone Star Conference. In their second year under head coach James B. Higgins, the team compiled a 3–7 record.

Schedule

References

Lamar
Lamar Cardinals football seasons
Lamar Tech Cardinals football